Orna may refer to:

Dress
Orna (garment), an garment item from South Asia, commonly worn with shalwar kameez

People
Orna Angel (born 1962), Israeli politician 
Orna Banai (born 1969), Israeli actress, comedian, and entertainer
Orna Barbivai (born 1962), general in the Israel Defense Forces and Israeli politician
Orna Ben-Naftali, Israeli legal academic and commentator on human rights in Israel 
Orna Berry, Israeli entrepreneur and scientist
Orna Ní Choileáin, Irish author and musician
Orna Datz, Israeli singer, actress and television personality 
Orna Grumberg Israeli computer scientist and academic
Orna Lin, Israeli labor lawyer
Orna Ostfeld (born 1952), Israeli basketball player and coach
Orna Porat (born 1924), Israeli theater actress

See also
Ornäs, Sweden